= Spoon beak =

Spoon beak may refer to:

- Northern shoveler
- Spoonbill
